The 2015–16 Northeastern Huskies men's basketball team represented Northeastern University during the 2015–16 NCAA Division I men's basketball season. The Huskies, led by tenth year head coach Bill Coen, played their home games at Matthews Arena and were members of the Colonial Athletic Association. They finished the season 18–15, 9–9 in CAA play to finish in sixth place. They advanced to the semifinals of the CAA tournament where they lost to UNC Wilmington.

Previous season 
The Huskies finished the 2014–15 season 23–12, 12–6 in CAA play to finish in a four-way tie for the CAA regular season championship. They defeated Delaware, UNC Wilmington, and William & Mary to become champions of the CAA tournament. As a result, they received the conference's automatic bid to the NCAA tournament, their first NCAA bid since 1991, where they lost in the second round to Notre Dame.

Departures

Recruiting

Roster

Schedule

|-
!colspan=9 style=| Non-conference regular season

|-
!colspan=9 style=| CAA regular season

|-
!colspan=9 style=| CAA tournament

References

Northeastern Huskies men's basketball seasons
Northeastern